The 2022 Internazionali di Tennis Città di Trieste was a professional tennis tournament played on clay courts. It was the 3rd edition of the tournament which was part of the 2022 ATP Challenger Tour. It took place in Trieste, Italy between 18 and 24 July 2022.

Singles main-draw entrants

Seeds

 1 Rankings are as of 11 July 2022.

Other entrants
The following players received wildcards into the singles main draw:
  Mattia Bellucci
  Marco Cecchinato
  Matteo Gigante

The following player received entry into the singles main draw as a special exempt:
  Francesco Maestrelli

The following players received entry into the singles main draw as alternates:
  Luciano Darderi
  Nerman Fatić

The following players received entry from the qualifying draw:
  Andrey Chepelev
  Ernests Gulbis
  Lukas Neumayer
  Giovanni Oradini
  Samuel Vincent Ruggeri
  Zhang Zhizhen

Champions

Singles

 Francesco Passaro def.  Zhang Zhizhen 4–6, 6–3, 6–3.

Doubles

 Diego Hidalgo /  Cristian Rodríguez def.  Marco Bortolotti /  Sergio Martos Gornés 4–6, 6–3, [10–5].

References

Internazionali di Tennis Città di Trieste
2022 in Italian tennis
July 2022 sports events in Italy